The Kazakhstan women's national rugby union team, nicknamed the Nomads, represents Kazakhstan in women's rugby union and is governed by the Kazakhstan Rugby Union. They have competed in six Rugby World Cup's, having made their first appearance in 1994 in Scotland. They compete annually in the Asia Rugby Women's Championship and have won five tournaments.

History
Kazakhstan has competed in six Rugby World Cups between 1994 and 2014. They won the 2014 Asian Four Nations Championship in Hong Kong. Up to 2019, Kazakhstan had only played four international matches since the 2014 World Cup. They defeated China in the 2019 Asia Rugby Women's Championship Division 1 competition and qualified for the 2020 Asia Rugby Women's Championship.

The 2020 Asia Rugby Women's Championship was postponed twice before it was cancelled altogether. The Nomads were left to play Hong Kong who later withdrew due to challenges caused by COVID-19. They qualified for the repechage tournament and met Colombia who saw them off with a 18–10 victory in a semifinal berth.

On December 2022, Kazakhstan fell five places in rankings, from 15th to 20th, after two consecutive losses to Hong Kong.

Records

Overall 

(Full internationals only)

Rugby World Cup

Players

Recent Squad

Previous Squads

See also
 Rugby union in Kazakhstan

References

External links
 Kazakhstan rugby 
 Tries and Tribulations

Women's national rugby union teams
women
Rugby union in Kazakhstan